Picture Paris is a 2012 short HBO film about a suburban woman with an empty nest who exhibits a passion for Paris. The film was written and directed by Brad Hall, starred Julia Louis-Dreyfus and Grégory Fitoussi and was shot in Paris in 2011. It was entered into the 2012 Tribeca Film Festival.

Notes

External links
 official website
 Picture Paris at The New York Times
 

2012 films
Films set in Paris
Films shot in Paris
HBO Films films
American comedy-drama television films
2012 comedy-drama films
Comedy-drama short films
2010s American films